Ribordone is a comune (municipality) in the Metropolitan City of Turin in the Italian region Piedmont, about 45 km northwest of Turin. At 31 December 2004 it had a population of 81 and an area of 44.2 km2.

Ribordone borders the following municipalities: Ronco Canavese, Locana, and Sparone.

Population history

References

Cities and towns in Piedmont
Canavese